Lunery is a commune in the Cher department in the Centre-Val de Loire region of France.

Geography
The commune is served by a TER railway link to Bourges.

Population

Sights
 The church of St. Privé, dating from the thirteenth century.
 The chateau at Champroy.
 The church of St. Albert at Rosières, dating from the nineteenth century.
 The fifteenth-century manorhouse de La Vergne.

See also
Communes of the Cher department

References

Communes of Cher (department)